Radio 2000 is a South African national radio station. Owned by the South African Broadcasting Corporation (SABC) and based in Johannesburg, it broadcasts nationally between 97.2 and 100 FM. It is one of several radio stations in South Africa that broadcasts live sport reports.

When it was established in July 1986, Radio 2000 would "simulcast" the original soundtracks of television programmes which were dubbed in Afrikaans, thereby catering for English speakers who wished to watch them in the original language.

Coverage areas & frequencies 

National (97.2 - 100.0 FM)

Broadcast languages
English

Broadcast time
24/7

Target audience
LSM Groups 7 – 10

Listenership figures

scope="row"/ March 2022
!2800 354

References

External links 
Official Website

Radio stations in Johannesburg
Radio stations established in 1986